Walter Henry "Dick" Lee  (19 March 1889 – 11 September 1968) was an Australian rules footballer who played for the Collingwood Football Club in the (then) Victorian Football League (VFL).

Family
The son of long-term Collingwood trainer Walter Henry Lee (1863–1952), and Isabella Lee (1867–1929), née Turnbull, Walter Henry Lee was born in Collingwood on 19 March 1889. He married Zella Dixon in 1927.

Football
Lee was one of the first great forwards in Australian Football with an ability to win the ball on the ground or in the air. He was considered one of the finest practitioners of the place kick in the game, a reputation which followed long after the skill disappeared from the game.

In 1912, Lee had a cartilage removed from his knee; and, according to his (then) team captain, Dan Minogue, writing in 1937, Lee was the first senior VFL footballer to have that operation.

His last kick in his last match for Collingwood scored Collingwood's final goal in its six-point loss to Fitzroy in the 1922 VFL Grand Final.

Death
He died at Northcote, Victoria, on 11 September 1968.

Honours

Life Member
He was made a life member of the Collingwood Football Club in 1918.

Australian Football Hall of Fame
In 1996, Lee was inducted into the Australian Football Hall of Fame.

Team of the Century
In 1998, he was selected on the half-forward flank in the Collingwood team of the Century.

See also
 1908 Melbourne Carnival
 1911 Adelaide Carnival
 1914 Sydney Carnival
 1921 Perth Carnival

Footnotes

References
 Brown, Alf, "Dick Lee hits our football: Too little training: Too little stamina: Too many rules",  The Herald, (Saturday, 8 May 1954), p.17.
 de Lacy, H.A., "'Dick! Dick!—Dick-e-e-e!'", The Sporting Globe, (Saturday, 21 June 1941), p.6.
 de Lacy, H.A. "Football's Greatest Mark: Dick Lee Has My Vote, The Sporting Globe, (Saturday, 16 July 1949), p.2.
 de Lacy, H.A., "Dicky Lee 'gamest man to pull on a football boot' ", The Sporting Globe, (Wednesday, 6 May 1953), p.3.
 Hobbs, Greg, "Famous High Flying Forward Dies", The Age, (Thursday, 12 September 1968), p.28.
 Ross, J. (ed), 100 Years of Australian Football 1897–1996: The Complete Story of the AFL, All the Big Stories, All the Great Pictures, All the Champions, Every AFL Season Reported, Viking, (Ringwood), 1996. : especially "Dick Lee the first high flying Magpie – a new kind of full forward", p. 111.
 Thorp, Vic (as told to H.A. de Lacy), "Full Forwards He Has Met: Dick Lee Greatest of the Great, ''The Sporting Globe, (Saturday, 21 June 1938), p.5.

External links

 Australian Dictionary of Biography:  Lee, Walter Henry (Dick) (1889–1968)
 
 
 Dick Lee 1906–1922: Collingwood Forever.
 AFL Hall of Fame
 Boyles Football Photos: Dick Lee.

1889 births
1968 deaths
Australian rules footballers from Melbourne
Australian Rules footballers: place kick exponents
Collingwood Football Club players
Collingwood Football Club Premiership players
Australian Football Hall of Fame inductees
VFL Leading Goalkicker Medal winners
Three-time VFL/AFL Premiership players
People from Collingwood, Victoria